Kikos is a 1931 Soviet Armenian comedy-war film, directed by Patvakan Barkhudaryan and starring Hambartsum Khachanyan, Hrachia Nersisyan and Avet Avetisyan.

Cast 
Hambartsum Khachanyan
Hrachia Nersisyan
Avet Avetisyan
Kh. Abrahamyan
A. Ashimova
M. Garagash
V. Ilyin
Vasili Ilyin
Suren Kocharyan
K. Kogamov
Amasi Martirosyan
A. Papyan

References

External links
 

1931 films
1931 comedy films
Films directed by Patvakan Barkhudaryan
Armenian black-and-white films
Soviet black-and-white films
Films set in Armenia
Soviet comedy films
Soviet silent feature films
Soviet-era Armenian films
Armenfilm films
1932 comedy films
1932 films
Armenian comedy films
Silent comedy films